838 Naval Air Squadron (838 NAS) was a Naval Air Squadron of the Royal Navy's Fleet Air Arm.

They had formed and worked-up at RN Air Section Dartmouth, Nova Scotia, on 15 May 1942, and had flown across country to San Francisco,  thirty-five and a half hours' flying time in a journey spread over seven and a half days.

References

800 series Fleet Air Arm squadrons
Military units and formations established in 1942
Military units and formations of the Royal Navy in World War II